Roque is a Spanish and Portuguese surname. Notable people with the surname include:
 Ademir Roque Kaefer (born 1960), Brazilian football player
 Alphonse Roque-Ferrier (1844-1907), French philologist
 Ana Roque de Duprey (1853–1933), Puerto Rican educator and suffragist
 Bruno Roque de Sousa (born 1989), Brazilian football player
 Carlos Roque (1936–2006), Portuguese comics artist
 Christine Roque (born 1965) French singer
 Felipe Pérez Roque (born 1965), Cuban politician
 Francis Xavier Roque (1928-2019), American Roman Catholic bishop
 Frank Roque (1959–2022), American convicted murderer
 Harry Roque (born 1966), Filipino lawyer and former law professor
 Hélio Roque (born 1985), Portuguese football player
 Horácio Roque (1944–2010), Portuguese financier and businessman
 Humberto Roque Villanueva (born 1943), Mexican politician
 Jacinto Roque de Sena Pereira (1784–1850), Portuguese sailor
 Jacqueline Roque (1927–1986), French model
 Joao Roque (born 1971), Angolan mixed martial arts fighter
 Juan Roque (born 1974), American football player
 Maicon Pereira Roque (born 1988), Brazilian football player
 Marian P. Roque, Filipina mathematician
 Mariano Roque Alonzo (died 1853), Paraguayan politician
 Marta Beatriz Roque (born 1945), Cuban political dissident
 Miki Roque (born 1988), Spanish football player
 Nuno Roque, Portuguese actor and singer
 Rafael Roque (born 1972), Dominican baseball player
 Randolph Roque Calvo, American Roman Catholic bishop

See also
 Roque (disambiguation)

Spanish-language surnames
Portuguese-language surnames